Feriola is a genus of flies in the family Tachinidae.

Species
Feriola angustifrons Shima, 1988
Feriola insularis Richter, 1986
Feriola longicornis Mesnil, 1957

References

Dexiinae
Diptera of Asia
Tachinidae genera